George Newton Best (October 16, 1846 – June 18, 1926) was an American bryologist, expert on moss taxonomy, and second president of the Sullivant Moss Society.

Biography
Best attended Lafayette College for three years before leaving to teach high school in Riegelsville, Pennsylvania. He resumed his education at the University of Pennsylvania, graduating with a degree in medicine in 1875. He took up his medical practice in the Rosemont section of Delaware Township, Hunterdon County, New Jersey.

Best was also a prominent bryologist, contributing often to Torrey Botanical Club publications. He was instrumental in revising and reclassifying many moss genera, including Thuidium, Claopodium, Heterocladium, Leskea, and Pseudoleskea. 

Best served as associate editor of The Bryologist from 1911 until his death, and as president of the Sullivant Moss Society from 1901 to 1902. Best was also a member of the Medical Society of New Jersey, American Medical Association, and Torrey Botanical Club. He died on June 18, 1926.

Legacy
Best's personal herbarium of mosses and publications were absorbed into the collection of the New York Botanical Garden.

In 1906, botanist Broth. published Bestia, which is a genus of mosses belonging to the family Lembophyllaceae and it was named in George Newton Best's honour.

Selected publications
Best, G. (1896). Revision of the North American Thuidiums. Bulletin of the Torrey Botanical Club, 23(3), 78–90. 
Best, G. (1897). Revision of the Claopodiums. Bulletin of the Torrey Botanical Club, 24(9), 427–432. 
Best, G. (1900). Revision of the North American Species of Pseudoleskea. Bulletin of the Torrey Botanical Club, 27(5), 221–236. 
Best, G. (1901). Revision of the North American Species of Heterocladium. Bulletin of the Torrey Botanical Club, 28(2), 123–131. 
Best, G. (1901). Vegetative Reproduction of Mosses. The Bryologist, 4(1), 1º3. 
Best, G. (1903). Revision of the North American Species of Leskea. Bulletin of the Torrey Botanical Club, 30(9), 463–482.

References

1846 births
1926 deaths
American botanists
People from Delaware Township, Hunterdon County, New Jersey
University of Pennsylvania alumni